The 2006 Toronto Transit Commission wildcat strike was an unlawful strike in Toronto, Ontario, Canada, that occurred on May 29, 2006. It was initiated by 800 Toronto Transit Commission mechanical and janitorial workers who were protesting proposed changes in work schedules, including permanent reassignment of 100 workers to night shifts.

The strike began between 4a.m. and 5a.m. EDT, and quickly resulted in a large scale disruption of service when transit drivers honoured the picket line, effectively shutting down the Toronto transit system. The shutdown left over a million commuters searching for alternative means of transport and cost an estimated $3 million in lost revenues.

By 7a.m. the Ontario Labour Relations Board (OLRB) issued a cease-and-desist order to pickets; this order was ignored. A further back-to-work directive was forwarded by the OLRB, and eventually Amalgamated Transit Union officials requested the workers to comply, the call coming just before 3p.m. EDT. Given the logistical difficulties, limited service slowly increased, with full service resuming later in the evening.

General synopsis

Workers argued that there was a declining state of conditions since the latest collective bargaining agreement was ratified, and worker morale in the TTC was lingering along the lines of discontent. Workers perceived a lack of good health premiums, arbitrary shift changes, lack of action on operator safety, and an assortment of other grievances assembled by the Amalgamated Transit Union (ATU) Local 113; Many argued that these were not being fully acknowledged by the management.

Indeed, a series of rebuttals were assembled by management's executives and several commissioners against the union's grievances. The most notable refutation is owed to the issue of operator safety. It had been suggested by several union detractors that in roads were being made in regard to improving working conditions for operators. Among several recommendations laid out by a joint task force (the inception of this panel was approved by both the union and management), the most publicized suggestions involved the idea of installing cameras and erecting some form of artificial barrier between the operator and individual customers. This seemingly conciliatory approach to union grievances gave TTC's management much valued public sympathy. Some experts in worker relations suggest that a wildcat strike would have been unfathomable if relations were indeed amicable.

Growing tension between TTC's management and its union were not relenting. Signs of an impending strike action on the part of unionized workers were becoming evermore apparent to those inside the TTC. Evidence is seen in a press conference held by union executives days before the strike action. As well, Bob Kinnear, president of ATU Local 113, issued a series of automated messages to his constituents who numbered up to and around 8,500 TTC workers. He informed them that many of the most critical issues had yet to be resolved through joint negotiations with management. Although Kinnear's comments never implied any form of job action, it was suggested that many members of the union took his messages as such.

The wildcat strike which took place on the May 29, 2006, was not initiated by joint action of all the unionized workers in the TTC. Picket lines were assembled by a relatively small number of mechanical and janitorial workers (approximately 800) across many of the TTC's yards and garages; locations that housed buses, streetcars, and subway trains. Many operators who showed up for their morning shift joined their co-workers in a sign of solidarity, and the remainder were asked by the TTC not to cross the picket lines. Without the operators passing through the picket lines, transit service was halted.

Over 700,000 commuters were forced to find alternate forms of transportation for the day. The bewilderment observed on the faces of many early-day commuters speaks volumes as to the spontaneity of the strike. The public was essentially left in the dark throughout the build-up of tensions within the TTC. The day was also notable as it was the hottest day of the year to that point, with the temperature peaking 40 degrees Celsius when the humidex was added in.

Rumours of the strike only hit the news very late on Sunday night, and many who were sleeping or working at the time had no way of knowing what was waiting for them in the morning. Finding alternate forms of transportation, some people who became aware of the strike action had to tell others at bus and streetcar stops along their way. Some decided to walk as there was no other option at their disposal. Both management and union members were fully aware of this state of discord. Even though the wildcat strike itself was a surprise, some suggest that the stressed relationship between these two parties should have been indicators on their own right. The strike began at 12 am for maintenance employees and the bus drivers and streetcar and subway operators followed early in the morning.

At around noon, the Ontario Labour Relations Board (OLRB) "issue[d] a cease and desist order requiring workers to report back to work immediately." This order was completely ignored by picketers. Shop stewards kept strikers in line by advising them to await orders from Kinnear himself. A couple hours later, the OLRB reassembled, dispatching a back-to-work order, reinforcing their earlier promulgation. Kinnear remained defiant throughout the wildcat strike, but eventually bowed to pressure and advised all picketing workers to return to work. He asked the workers to do it "For the travelling Public, not the TTC Management". Rogue picket lines that refused to dissolve were done so through the assistance of the Toronto Police Service.

Aftermath

Immediately after the strike's end, several members of Toronto City Council, along with countless commuters, saw recourse in the idea of enforcing strict disciplinary penalties against the union and its membership. Toronto Mayor David Miller, contrary to pro-union inclinations of the past, introduced the idea of prosecuting the Amalgamated Transit Union; a strategic move that paralleled the opinions of his constituents. If such a route were to proceed, it had been suggested that individual fines for the over 800 mechanical and janitorial workers who started the picket lines would be one of the prosecution's top priorities, behind charging the union itself. This externalized approach to dealing with lost revenue was inspired by a similar event that erupted in New York City during the winter of 2005. New York's transit strike ended with a union boss being given a short prison sentence, while the union itself was fined for the economic disruption it caused. Kinnear brushed off suggestions that he too was in line for incarceration. Instead, he embraced the idea, signifying his willingness to act as the union's martyr.

On May 31, 2006, Local 113 published an attack ad against the commission chair Howard Moscoe, Mayor Miller, and Rick Ducharme, chief-general manager of the TTC. In it, the union argued that negligent and careless behaviour by the three men, essentially reflecting management's posture, had led Bobby Lowe, a bus operator who was physically assaulted on shift, into disparity. The ad effectively illustrated how Lowe's life was ruined as a result of receiving deficient forms of compensation from the commission, and due to their overall laissez-faire stance on the issue of operator safety. After Moscoe rebuked the ad with scathing criticisms of its accuracy, Lowe himself visited the former in his city hall office, illustrating his discontent over the allegations. Moscoe later retracted most of his comments. Some saw the attack ad as the essential variable that legitimized the wildcat strike, while others saw it as the union's complacency over other contentious issues such as the state of janitorial and mechanical workers; an issue that was seen as less media friendly in comparison to the matter of operator safety. It had also been suggested that if the union moved forward with a similar Public Relations campaign before the wildcat strike, they would have received more sympathy from the public. Some also charge the union of foul play by not concentrating on the problems facing initial strikers themselves.

The power struggle between management, the commissioners, and the union, eventually ended with Rick Ducharme's resignation on June 6, 2006. Ducharme had criticized the councilors on the TTC board for interfering with labour negotiations, as there were closed door meetings between TTC commissioners and the union which excluded management; management was the traditional negotiator with the union, not the board.

At the end of 2007, the TTC dropped its $3 million lawsuit against the union, while the event was no longer referred to as a "wildcat strike", but an incident.

See also

 Strike action
 Toronto Transit Commission
 2008 TTC strike
 Toronto Transit Commission personnel

References

External links

 Amalgamated Transit Union Local 113 official website
 TTC official website
 The official website of the city of Toronto

Toronto Transit Commission Wildcat Strike, 2006
Labour disputes in Ontario
Toronto Transit Commission
Toronto Transit Commission Wildcat Strike, 2006
Anarchism in Canada